Białe Błota-Dębowiec  is a village in the administrative district of Gmina Bobrowniki, within Lipno County, Kuyavian-Pomeranian Voivodeship, in northcentral Poland.

References

Villages in Lipno County